In mathematics, a quadratic transformation may be
A quadratic transformation in the Cremona group
Kummer's quadratic transformation of the hypergeometric function